Ingleside is a historic house in the Mount Pleasant neighborhood of Washington, D.C. The house was designed by architect Thomas U. Walter
and completed around 1850. From 1896 to 1904, it was owned by Thomas C. Noyes, an editor, part-owner, and publisher of the Washington Evening Star and owner of the Washington Senators baseball team.

It has been listed on the District of Columbia Inventory of Historic Sites since 1979 and it was listed on the National Register of Historic Places in 1987.  It is a contributing property in the Mount Pleasant Historic District.

References

External links 
 

Houses completed in 1851
Italianate architecture in Washington, D.C.
Houses on the National Register of Historic Places in Washington, D.C.